Roberto Jordán (born February 20, 1943, in Los Mochis, Sinaloa, Mexico) is a popular singer whose heyday occurred during Mexico's nueva ola (new wave) of music in the late 1960s and early 1970s. Many of his songs were covers of English-language rock and pop songs, with arrangements provided by music teachers and producers Enrique Okamura and Eduardo Magallanes. Jordán popularized several Bubblegum rock songs among youth in the Spanish-speaking world, singing songs by the 1910 Fruitgum Company, the Ohio Express and The Turtles as well as introducing the repertoire of singer-songwriters like Neil Diamond and Joe South.

Jordán left the stage for a number of years to pursue business and sports. In the mid-1980s, he returned to performing and even recorded a new version of his onetime hit Hazme una señal (a cover version of Brenton Wood's Gimme Little Sign). He also performed at a reunion concert with original Mexican rock acts such as Los Rockin' Devils, Los Teen Tops and Los Hermanos Carrión in 2006.

Discography (partial) 

 1968 – Hazme Una Señal, RCA Victor
 1968 – 1,2,3 Detente!, RCA Victor
 1970 – Castillos de Algodón, RCA Victor
 1999 – Roberto Jordán (best-of compilation), Tepito Records

References

Videos
 

1943 births
Living people
Mexican male singers
People from Los Mochis
Singers from Sinaloa